In functional analysis, every C*-algebra is isomorphic to a subalgebra of the C*-algebra  of bounded linear operators on some Hilbert space  This article describes the spectral theory of closed normal subalgebras of .

Resolution of identity 

Throughout,  is a fixed Hilbert space.

A resolution of identity on a measurable space  is a function  such that for every :
;
;
;
if  then ;

If  is the -algebra of all Borels sets on a Hausdorff locally compact (or compact) space, then the following additional requirement is added:
for every  the map  is a regular Borel measure (this is automatically satisfied on compact metric spaces).
Conditions 2, 3, and 4 imply that  is a projection-valued measure.

Properties 

Throughout, let  be a resolution of identity.  

For every :
 (since both are equal to ).
<li> is finitely additive. 

L∞(π) - space of essentially bounded function 

The  be a resolution of identity on

Essentially bounded functions 

Suppose  is a complex-valued -measurable function.
To see why, let  be a basis for 's topology consisting of open disks and suppose that  is the subsequence (possibly finite) consisting of those sets such that ; then  Note that, in particular, if  is an open subset of  such that  then  so that  (although there are other ways in which  may equal ). Indeed, 

The essential range is a closed subset of  so that if it is also a bounded subset of  then it is compact.

Space of essentially bounded functions 

Let  be the vector space of all bounded complex-valued -measurable functions  which becomes a Banach algebra when normed by  
The function  is a seminorm on  but not necessarily a norm. 
The kernel of this seminorm,  is a vector subspace of  that is a closed two-sided ideal of the Banach algebra  

Spectral theorem 

The above result can be specialized to a single normal bounded operator.

See also

References 

  
  
  
  

C*-algebras
Spectral theory